James Arthur Frost, was an historian who received his B.A., M.A. and Ph.D. degrees from Columbia University. He taught at the University of New York College-Oneonta, and was the author of several books and many articles. Frost served as the vice-chancellor for the colleges of arts and science at the State University of New York and as president of the Connecticut State University System.

Bibliography

 Life On The Upper Susquehanna 1783-1860, James Arthur Frost; Published by King's Crown Press (1951)
 A Short History of New York State,  David M. Ellis; James Arthur Frost; Harold C. Syrett; Harry J. Carman; Published by Cornell University Press (1957)
 A History of New York State,  David M. Ellis; James Arthur Frost; Harold C. Syrett; Harry J. Carman; Published by Cornell University Press (1967)
 A History of the United States: The Evolution of a Free People, James Arthur Frost; Published by Follett (1969)
 New York, the Empire State, David Maldwyn Ellis; James Arthur Frost; William Bertrand Fink; Published by Prentice Hall (1979), 
 The Country Club of Farmington, 1892-1995, James Arthur Frost; Published by Country Club of Farmington (1996),

References 

1918 births
2017 deaths